Bayannurosaurus is a non-hadrosauriform ankylopollexian ornithopod described in 2018 by Xu Xing. It lived during the early Aptian period, being found in the Bayin-Gobi Formation of China. The genus includes the type species Bayannurosaurus perfectus. A phylogenetic analysis of Bayannurosaurus indicates that it is more derived than Hypselospinus, yet less derived than Ouranosaurus and just outside of the Hadrosauriformes. The genus name Bayannurosaurus comes from Bayannur, the area where it was found, while the species name perfectus comes from the "perfect" preservation of the holotype specimen.

See also
2018 in paleontology

References

Iguanodonts
Early Cretaceous dinosaurs of Asia
Fossil taxa described in 2018
Cretaceous China
Ornithischian genera